Chrysoclista linneella, (common names include Linnaeus's spangle-wing, linden bark borer and cosmet) is a moth of the family Agonoxenidae found in Europe and North America.

Description
Adults are on wing from May to September.

The larvae feed on lime trees (Tilia species) and are difficult to locate except for the existence of brownish frass on the surface of the trunk. They mine the bark of their host plant.

Distribution
It is found in most of Europe, in all of the Baltic and Fennoscandian countries, Great Britain, the Netherlands, Belgium, Luxembourg, Germany, Poland, Czech Republic, Slovakia, Hungary, Austria,  Slovenia, Switzerland, France, Spain, Italy, Romania, Russia, Turkey and Ukraine. Furthermore, it is an introduced species in North America, where it was first reported in New York City in 1928. In the United States there are reports and records from other parts of New York State, New Jersey, near Boston, Massachusetts, Connecticut, and Vermont. In Canada, it is only known from Ontario and Nova Scotia.

References

Moths described in 1759
Agonoxeninae
Leaf miners
Moths of Europe
Moths of North America
Taxa named by Carl Alexander Clerck